Susanne Andersen (born 23 July 1998) is a Norwegian professional racing cyclist, who currently rides for UCI Women's WorldTeam . At the 2016 UCI Road World Championships in Qatar, Andersen finished 13th in the junior individual time trial. On her way back to the hotel she was hit by a car; despite her injuries she won the bronze medal in the junior road race four days later.

Major results
2015
 National Junior Road Championships
1st  Time trial
2nd Road race
 1st  National Junior Cyclo-cross Championships
 5th UCI Junior Road Race World Championships
2016
 National Junior Road Championships
1st  Road race
1st  Time trial
 3rd UCI Junior Road Race World Championships
2017
 1st  Criterium, National Road Championships
 1st  Norwegian rider classification Ladies Tour of Norway
 2nd Road race, UEC European Under-23 Road Championships
 7th Road race, UCI Road World Championships
2018
 Combativity award Stage 1 The Women's Tour
 2nd Road race, National Road Championships
2021
 2nd GP Eco-Struct
2022
 4th Vuelta a la Comunitat Valenciana Feminas
 4th Le Samyn
 6th GP Oetingen
 7th Gent–Wevelgem

See also
List of 2016 UCI Women's Teams and riders

References

External links
 

1998 births
Living people
Norwegian female cyclists
Sportspeople from Stavanger
European Games competitors for Norway
Cyclists at the 2019 European Games
21st-century Norwegian women